DXMK-TV (channel 12) is a television station in Mt. Kitanglad, Bukidnon, Philippines, airing programming from the GMA network. Owned and operated by the network's namesake corporate parent, the station maintains a transmitting facility atop Mount Kitanglad, Bukidnon, whereas GMA studio located in Cagayan de Oro City.

History
DXMK-TV Channel 12 started as a strong signal operations in 1980s, where the entire Northern Mindanao region and Iligan City have, following the variant of the GMA Radio-Television Arts ident and introduced the Where You Belong slogan to catch the attention of local viewers, with the used of the blue circle 12 logo in its final years, which was similar to those used by the ABC in some United States cities and later used the rainbow colors of red, yellow, green and blue stripes.

On April 30, 1992, as part of the network's expansion of coverage which started exactly four years after with the inauguration of the network's Tower of Power in its flagship station in Manila (based in Quezon City), DXMK-TV Channel 12 was introduced of the Rainbow Satellite network launch. Through its nationwide satellite broadcast, GMA's national programmings were seen across the Philippine archipelago and Southeast Asia resulting the station becoming a relay (satellite-selling) station of the network's flagship station DZBB-TV to viewers in the Northern Mindanao region (mostly in Bukidnon and Iligan City), with the utilizes a new logo to correspond with the rebranding and a satellite-beaming rainbow in a multicolored striped based on the traditional scheme of red, orange, yellow, green, blue, indigo and violet, with GMA in a metallic form uses a San Serif Century Gothic Extra Font and analogous gloominess of Indigo as its fonts in the letters.

In 2010s, GMA Cagayan de Oro was launched its relay station on Channel 35 (a frequency was used to be launched QTV/Q and GMA News TV from its inception on November 11, 2005, until it was assigned to Channel 43 in 2012 and now went inactive) because the transmitter in Mt. Kitanglad was weak and signals from Cagayan de Oro and some parts of Bukidnon.

On August 28, 2017, following the newly-relaunched of the network's Regional TV division, GMA Bukidnon was downgraded into a semi-satellite station of GMA TV-5 Davao to form the network's Mindanao super region, opting out master control from Davao-based station. As part of the new development, it began to co-producing and simulcasting the first ever Mindanao-wide newscast One Mindanao, which then expanding its local programmings influence to the Southern Mindanao and later to Northern Mindanao and Caraga.

GMA TV-12 Bukidnon current programs
 One Mindanao (Monday to Friday 5:10 PM)
 At Home with GMA Regional TV (Monday to Friday 8:00 AM)
All programs are produced and carried by GMA-5 Davao station.

See also
 DXJC-TV
 DXMJ-TV
 List of GMA Network stations

References

Television channels and stations established in 1980
GMA Network stations